Rona, RONA or Róna may refer to:

Places
Rona (Kristiansand), a neighbourhood in Kristiansand, Norway
Rona (river), a river in Maramureș County, Romania
Rona, Bellevue Hill, a historic house in the Sydney suburb of Bellevue Hill
Rona, Switzerland, a village
Rona, a village in Jibou town, Sălaj County, Romania
Rona, a peninsula/island of the Isle of May in Scotland
Rona de Jos and Rona de Sus, communes in Maramureș County, Romania
North Rona, a Scottish island in the North Atlantic
South Rona, a Scottish island in the Inner Hebrides
Tinizong-Rona, a Swiss municipality

People

Given name

Rona, a diminutive of the Russian male given name Aaron
Rona Ambrose (born 1969), former interim leader of the Conservative Party of Canada and Leader of the Opposition in the House of Commons
Rona Anderson (1926–2013), Scottish stage, film, and television actress
Rona Barrett (born 1936), American gossip columnist and businesswoman
 Rona Coleman (active from 1970s), Australian actress
 Rona Dougall (born late 1960s), Scottish broadcast journalist and television presenter
 Rona Elliot (born 1947), American music journalist 
Rona Fairhead, (born 1961), British businesswoman and chairwoman of the BBC Trust
 Rona Green (disambiguation), several people
 Rona Hartner (born 1973), Romanian actress,  painter and singer
 Rona Hurley (1897–1985), New Zealand tobacco grower and buyer
Rona Jaffe, (1931–2005), American novelist
 Rona Jaffe Foundation Writers' Award, awarded annually since 1995 to beginning women writers
 Rona Kenan (born 1979), Israeli singer/songwriter
 Rona E. Kramer (born 1954), American politician from Maryland
 Rona Lightfoot (born 1936), Scottish piper and singer
 Rona Mackay (active from 2016), Scottish politician
 Rona McKenzie (1922-1999), New Zealand female cricketer
 Rona McLeod (active 1990s), Australian TV actress
Rhona Mitra (born 1975), English actress, model and singer
 Rona Moss-Morris (born before 2006), South African-born academic psychologist
Rona Munro (born 1959), Scottish writer
Rona Murray (1924-2003), Canadian poet
Rona Nishliu (born 1986), Kosovo-Albanian singer and radio presenter
Rona Pondick (born 1952), American sculptor
 Rona Randall (born 1911), British writer
 Rona Robinson, British suffragette who in 1905 was the first woman in the United Kingdom to gain a first-class degree in chemistry
Rona Rupert (1934–1995), South African author
 Rona Shapiro (born before 1990), American rabbi, the first female rabbi to head a Conservative synagogue in Cleveland
Rona Stevenson (1911–1988), New Zealand politician
 Rona Tong (born 1915/16), New Zealand track and field athlete who competed at the 1938 British Empire Games
 Rona Yefman (born 1972), Israeli artist based in New York City

Surname
Aliye Rona (1921–1996), Turkish film actress
András Róna-Tas (born 1931), Hungarian historian and linguist
 Andrew Rona (born 1971), American film producer and movie executive
 Curtis Rona (born 1992), New Zealand professional rugby league footballer
 Elizabeth Rona (1890-1981), Hungarian nuclear chemist
 Giannarigo Rona (born 1940), Italian bridge player and administrator, president of the World Bridge Federation from 2010
Jaroslav Róna (born 1957), Czech sculptor, painter, actor, educator, and writer
Jeff Rona (born 1957), American film composer
 József Róna (1861-1939), Hungarian sculptor and artist
 Mohammad Rona (born 1985), Afghan-born Danish politician
 Peter A. Rona (1934-2014), American oceanographer
Thomas P. Rona (1923–1997), American science adviser to the Defense Department and the White House under Presidents Reagan and George H. W. Bush

In fiction and mythology
Rona (Ojamajo Doremi), a fictional character in the Japanese anime series Ojamajo Doremi
Rona, a minor character on the American television program Buffy the Vampire Slayer
Rona, a legendary Maori woman who cursed the moon, whose legend is intertwined with that of the Myoporum laetum tree
Rona, a character in the anime series Endro!

Other uses
Cyclone Rona, hit Australia in 1999
Return on net assets, a measure of a company's performance 
 a New Zealand racing yacht
Rona, Inc. a Canadian hardware and home improvement retailer
Kaminski Brigade, or a self-proclaimed Russian National Liberation Army (RONA), a collaborationist formation composed largely of Russian nationals who fought for Nazi Germany

See also
 
 Rhona
 Ronas Hill, the highest point of Mainland, Shetland
 Ronas Ryon (foaled 1984), an American Quarter Horse
 Ronay, a Scottish island in the Outer Hebrides
 Ronna, a given name
 Corona (disambiguation)